Slag Hill is a subglacial volcano associated with the Mount Cayley volcanic field in British Columbia, Canada. It consists of glassy, augite-phyric basaltic andesite in steep-sided, glassy, finely jointed domes and one small, flat-topped bluff. The finely jointed domes are similar to those of Ember Ridge. There are quench features at Slag Hill, which is suggesting that the volcanic activity was subglacial. Slag Hill was formed throughout the Pleistocene period, but its most recent volcanic activity produced a lava flow on its western lobe that shows no evidence of ice-contact volcanism. This indicates the lava flow was erupted less than 10,000 years ago after the last glacial period.

References

See also
Mount Cayley
Cascade Volcanoes
Garibaldi Volcanic Belt
List of volcanoes in Canada
Volcanism of Canada
Volcanism of Western Canada

Volcanoes of British Columbia
Mountains of British Columbia
Subglacial volcanoes of Canada
Pleistocene volcanoes
Holocene volcanoes
Polygenetic volcanoes
Mount Cayley volcanic field